Aconcagua is a 1964 color Argentine adventure drama film directed by Leo Fleider and written by Norberto Aroldi. The title refers to the highest peak in the Andes—Aconcagua located in Argentina. The star of the film is Tito Alonso.

Production, distribution and release
Aconcagua was produced and distributed by Gloria Films and premiered in Buenos Aires on 18 June 1964.

Cast
 Tito Alonso
 Enrique Kossi
 Elisa Galvé
 Selva Alemán
 Héctor Pellegrini
 Alberto Ruschel
 Enrique Talión

External links
 
 Aconcagua  listing on the Argentine films website

Argentine adventure drama films
1964 films
1960s Spanish-language films
1960s Argentine films
Films directed by Leo Fleider